Riit (ᕇᑦ) is the stage name of Rita Claire Mike-Murphy, a Canadian Inuk musician and television personality from Pangnirtung, Nunavut who is most noted as the host of APTN's children's series Anaana's Tent.

As Riit, she released her self-titled debut EP, a collaboration with The Jerry Cans and producer Michael Phillip Wojewoda, in 2017 on Aakuluk Music. In 2019 she released the single "Qaumajuapik", and performed the song live on CBC Radio One's Q in May. Her album Ataataga, produced by Graham Walsh, was released in October 2019 on Six Shooter Records. The album was a Juno Award nominee for Indigenous Music Album of the Year at the Juno Awards of 2020, and was a longlisted nominee for the 2020 Polaris Music Prize. Her song "#uvangattauq" was shortlisted for the 2020 SOCAN Songwriting Prize.

She won the Emerging Talent Award from the Youth Media Alliance in 2019 for her work on Anaana's Tent.

In 2020 she appeared as a duet vocalist on Terry Uyarak's single "Anuri".

References

Canadian children's television personalities
Canadian women pop singers
21st-century Canadian women singers
Actresses from Nunavut
Musicians from Nunavut
Inuit actresses
Inuit musicians
Canadian Inuit women
People from Pangnirtung
Living people
Year of birth missing (living people)
Canadian women television personalities
Six Shooter Records artists